The Caretaker Cabinet of Panagiotis Pikrammenos was sworn in on May 17, 2012  after the end of the period of office of the Cabinet of Lucas Papademos, when an inconclusive election on May 6, 2012 resulted in a hung parliament. According to the provisions of the Greek Constitution, President Karolos Papoulias appointed Panagiotis Pikrammenos, the outgoing chairman of the Council of State, as caretaker Prime Minister after none of the major parties was able to form a government.

The subsequent elections were held on 17 June 2012, again resulting in a hung parliament, and this cabinet served until the formation of a coalition government on 21 June 2012.

Ministers

See also

Cabinets of Greece
2012 in Greek politics
Greek government-debt crisis
Cabinets established in 2012
Cabinets disestablished in 2012
2012 establishments in Greece
2012 disestablishments in Greece